Matthew Cobb (born 4 February 1957) is a British zoologist and professor of zoology at the University of Manchester. He is known for his popular science books The Egg & Sperm Race: The Seventeenth-Century Scientists Who Unravelled the Secrets of Sex, Life and Growth; Life's Greatest Secret: The Race to Crack the Genetic Code; and The Idea of the Brain: A History. Cobb has appeared on BBC Radio 4's The Infinite Monkey Cage, The Life Scientific, and The Curious Cases of Rutherford & Fry, as well as on BBC Radio 3 and the BBC World Service.

Education
Cobb earned his BA in Psychology at the University of Sheffield. During the second year of his undergraduate studies he read an article about the recent discovery of the Drosophila melanogaster dunce mutant in New Scientist and decided to focus on behaviour genetics in fruit flies, later saying he, "went on to do my PhD there, in Psychology and Genetics, looking at the mating behaviour of seven species of fruitfly. Psychology in those days was as much about animal behaviour as it was about human psychology, and I was lucky enough to be in one of the few places in the UK that studied [it]".

Career
From 1981 to 1984, Cobb conducted twin studies at London's Institute of Psychiatry (now the Institute of Psychiatry, Psychology and Neuroscience), research he later described as trying "to get human twins drunk". He has said, "This was interesting, but convinced me that I did not want to do research on human beings". In 1984, he obtained funding through the Royal Society's Science Exchange Programme to work with Jean-Marc Jallon in Gif-sur-Yvette, France, where he was introduced to the use of pheromones and smell by animals as a means of communication. Once his Royal Society grant finished, Cobb spent a year and a half working at the Université Sorbonne Paris Nord in Villetaneuse, where he lectured in psychophysiology.  In 1998, Cobb joined the French National Centre for Scientific Research (CNRS), working first at its Orsay facility, utilising Drosophila maggots to study the sense of smell, and from 1995 at its Laboratoire d'Ecologie in Paris where he investigated olfactory communication in ants.

Since 2002, Cobb has worked at the University of Manchester, initially as a lecturer in animal behaviour and later as professor of zoology.

Communicating science
Cobb has become known to a wider audience through his books for the general public. In 2007, his book The Egg and Sperm Race: The Seventeenth-Century Scientists Who Unravelled the Secrets of Sex, Life and Growth won the Thomson Reuters/Zoological Record Award for Communicating Zoology.

Life's Greatest Secret: The Story of the Race to Crack the Genetic Code, was shortlisted in 2015 for the £25,000 Royal Society Winton Prize.

In 2020, Cobb's book The Idea of the Brain was the only science work to be shortlisted for the £50,000 Baillie Gifford Prize for Non-Fiction. It was also chosen as one of The Sunday Times''' Books of the Year and The Daily Telegraph listed it as one of its "50 best books of 2020".

Cobb has made many appearances on radio, including appearances on the BBC science programmes The Curious Cases of Rutherford & Fry, Inside Science, and The Infinite Monkey Cage. In March 2020, he was the subject of the BBC Radio 4 programme The Life Scientific.

Cobb has written and provided expert comments for publications including New Scientist and The Guardian'', translated five books from French into English, and written two books on the history of France during World War II.

In December 2020, The Genetics Society said that it was "delighted to announce Professor Matthew Cobb as the winner of the 2021 JBS Haldane Lecture" adding that he is expected to present his lecture at the Royal Institution, in November 2021.

Books

As translator

As editor

References

External links
  – Prof Matthew Cobb at the University of Manchester website

1957 births
Living people
20th-century British zoologists
21st-century British zoologists
Alumni of the University of Sheffield
British expatriate academics in France
British science writers
British zoologists
French–English translators
Academics of the University of Manchester